Here Comes the Whistleman is a live album by jazz multi-instrumentalist Roland Kirk recorded in March 1965 at Atlantic Studios in New York, and released in 1967. It was his first release on the Atlantic label and features performances by Kirk with pianists Lonnie Liston Smith and Jaki Byard, bassist Major Holley and drummer Charles Crosby.

Critical reception
The AllMusic review by Thom Jurek states: "His band for the occasion is stellar ... This is the hard jump blues and deep R&B Roland Kirk band".

Track listing
All compositions by Roland Kirk except as indicated.
 "Roots" - 4:09  
 "Here Comes the Whistleman" - 4:53  
 "I Wished on the Moon" (Dorothy Parker, Ralph Rainger) - 4:48  
 "Making Love After Hours" - 4:20  
 "Yesterdays" (Otto Harbach, Jerome Kern) - 3:54  
 "Aluminum Baby" (Jaki Byard) - 4:41  
 "Step Right Up" - 4:41  
Recorded at Atlantic Studios, NY on March 14, 1965
A recent version of the album has longer tracks. There's on-stage chatter etc.

Personnel
Roland Kirk: tenor saxophone, manzello, stritch, flute, clarinet
Lonnie Liston Smith: piano
Jaki Byard: piano
Major Holley: bass 
Charles Crosby: drums

References

Rahsaan Roland Kirk live albums
1967 live albums
Albums produced by Joel Dorn
Atlantic Records live albums
Albums produced by Rahsaan Roland Kirk